Shield Media, LLC was a private American television broadcasting company based in Lafayette, Louisiana. The company's stations were operated by Nexstar Media Group under joint sales and shared services agreements.

History
The company was founded by Sheldon Galloway (the Vice President of White Knight Broadcasting) in 2012. The company's first acquisition was announced in July 2012, when WXXA-TV was sold by Newport Television for $19.5 million. Shield entered into a joint sales and shared services agreement with Young Broadcasting, owner of WTEN.

On October 11, 2012, Sinclair Broadcast Group filed to sell WLAJ to Shield Media for $14.4 million. After the sale's completion, the station then entered into shared services and joint sales agreements with Young Broadcasting-owned WLNS. The sale was completed on March 1, 2013.

On November 12, 2013, Media General completed its acquisition of Young Broadcasting and took over operation of the Shield Media stations. Nexstar Media Group succeeded this role after it acquired Media General on January 17, 2017.

On August 21, 2020, it was reported that Mission Broadcasting would acquire WLAJ and WXXA.  The sale was completed on November 23. The stations will continue to be operated by Nexstar.

Stations

See also
Vaughan Media
Young Broadcasting
Media General
Nexstar Media Group

References

2012 establishments in Louisiana
Companies based in Lafayette, Louisiana
Mass media companies established in 2012
Mass media companies disestablished in 2020
Defunct television broadcasting companies of the United States
Nexstar Media Group